"Darlene" is a song written by Mike Geiger, Woody Mullis and Ricky Ray Rector, and recorded by American country music artist T. Graham Brown.  It was released in May 1988 as the first single from the album Come as You Were.  The song was Brown's third and final number one on the country chart.  The single went to number one for one week and spent a total of fourteen weeks on the country chart.

Charts

Weekly charts

Year-end charts

References

1988 singles
1988 songs
T. Graham Brown songs
Song recordings produced by Ron Chancey
Capitol Records Nashville singles
Songs written by Mike Geiger
Songs written by Woody Mullis